Claire Engler (born January 18, 2001) is an American actress. She appeared in a recurring role as Violet in Disney Channel series A.N.T. Farm.

Engler also co-starred in the television pilots Other People's Kids (2011) and The Smart One (2012), however both pilots were not picked up to series. Her film credits include the short films Swing (2010) and 10 Seconds (2011).

Filmography

References

External links 

21st-century American actresses
American child actresses
American film actresses
American television actresses
Living people
Place of birth missing (living people)
2001 births